Jack Snowdon Hawkins (28 October 1929 – 11 December 2021), better known as Jack Hedley, was an English film, voice, radio, stage, character, theater, screen and television actor best known for his performances on television. His birth name necessitated a change to avoid confusion with his namesake who was already registered with the British actors' trade union Equity.

Personal life
Hedley was born in London in 1929. His mother, Dorothy Withill, was 19 when she gave birth to him, and later married Albert Hawkins in 1936, although this man was not his father. He never knew the identity of his biological father. He came from humble beginnings, and used to earn money by collecting sacks of horse manure from the streets and selling them as fertiliser. However, he won a Beaverbrook scholarship to Downleas prep school, then won another scholarship to Bryanston, and then another to Dartmouth. He took a degree in history in 18 months.

On leaving school, he became a cadet at the Royal Naval College, Dartmouth, then spent eight years as a Royal Marine Commando, which included active service in Malaya, India, the East Indies, Australia and Korea. He rose from cadet to lieutenant but was eventually invalided out after a bullet smashed the butt of his rifle into his leg. After 18 months working for his mother in her business, he lost interest.[1]

He was unsure of what to do with his life, when he decided to follow a group of girls into a building and found himself inside RADA drama school. He signed up, and joined at the same time as Glenda Jackson and Alan Bates. The day after he left RADA, he got his first acting job, a small part in a Granada Television play in Manchester.

His mother eventually turned her life around by establishing a direct mail firm and becoming a millionaire. Though for many years Jack was embarrassed by his origins, and answered questions on his "people" by saying they were either dead or abroad.

Hedley died of a heart attack after a brief illness on 11 December 2021, at the age of 92.

Career
His screen career began with a 13-minute drama-documentary about polio called A Life to be Lived. In the late 1950s, he appeared in films and on television, such as Left Right and Centre, Fair Game and the Alun Owen-scripted television play No Trams to Lime Street with Billie Whitelaw.

Hedley starred in the Francis Durbridge-scripted BBC series The World of Tim Frazer (transmitted from November 1960 to March 1961), the 18 instalments of which comprised three separate serials of six episodes each. He also played Corrigan Blake in Alun Owen's BBC play You Can't Win 'Em All (1962) the role being taken over by John Turner in the series Corrigan Blake that resulted the following year. He was also in Alun Owen's A Little Winter Love (1965), part of the Theatre 625 series.

He appeared in several British films of the 1960s, including Lawrence of Arabia (1962), The Scarlet Blade (1963), Witchcraft (1964), Of Human Bondage (1964), The Secret of Blood Island (1964) and The Anniversary (1968), as well as in the occasional international film such as The Longest Day (1962). He also had a lead role as Lt. Colonel Preston in Colditz (1972–74). He also starred with Stanley Baker and Jean Seberg in the film of Irwin Shaw's In The French Style (1963).

Hedley later appeared in the James Bond film For Your Eyes Only (1981) as Sir Timothy Havelock, also voicing Havelock's parrot. Initially he was reticent to demean himself by playing a parrot, but quickly changed his mind when he found out he would receive £1,200 for ten minutes' work. Soon after this, in the autumn of 1981 he played the lead role (cynical investigative cop Fred Williams) in Lucio Fulci's The New York Ripper (Lo squartatore di New York, 1982), in which his voice was dubbed by American actor Edward Mannix.
His other TV appearances include: The Edgar Wallace Mystery Theatre- Never Back Losers (1961),The Saint (1965), Gideon's Way ("The Alibi Man", 1965), Softly, Softly (1967), Dixon of Dock Green (1969), The Buccaneers (1957), the ex-serviceman Alan Haldane in Who Pays the Ferryman? (1977), Return of the Saint (1979), One by One (1984), Remington Steele (also 1984), Only Fools and Horses ("A Royal Flush", 1986), 'Allo 'Allo (1992), Dalziel and Pascoe (1998) and the TV film version of Brief Encounter (1974).

In the late 1980s he appeared in a comical German advert for After Eight Mints, which proved to be extremely popular and the campaign lasted for five years. It provided him with constantly good fees, and he referred to it as his "pension".

He retired from acting relatively early, admitting that he found the wealth and travel opportunities far more enticing than the urge to perform. He found most actors "a sorry lot" and did not have many friends among them, saying that "Acting is not an art, it is just an interpretation, an actor does not create anything. That is why most of them are so short-sighted".

Filmography

References

External links
 
 

1929 births
2021 deaths
20th-century English male actors
English male film actors
English male television actors
Male actors from London
People educated at Emanuel School
Royal Marines officers